Aktau is a city in Kazakhstan, located on the eastern shore of the Caspian Sea. Its current name means "white mountain" in Kazakh, which may be due to its cliffs that overlook the Caspian. From 1964 to 1991, the city was known as Shevchenko. Its former name was given due to the eponymous Ukrainian poet's period of exile in the area. It is located on the Mangyshlak Peninsula and is the capital of the Mangystau Region.

Aktau is known for its unique block address system. Almost no streets in Aktau have names; instead, addresses generally consist of three numbers: the district number (also known as micro-region/micro-district/block), the building number, and the apartment number. This is because Aktau was originally planned as a camp for the workers of the oil industry.

History
The territory of what is now Aktau was once inhabited by ancient tribes of Scythians. Archeological finds in the area include old settlements and utensils. The current territory of Mangystau hosted a spur route of the northern silk road, which resulted in the founding of several Sufi shrines in Aktau's vicinity. However, the area had very little population prior to Soviet times and no cities of any relevancy, almost certainly due to the scarcity of fresh water.

In 1958, uranium prospectors settled the site of modern Aktau, naming the settlement Melovoye after the bay on which it stood. After the development of the uranium deposits was started, the settlement was closed and renamed Guryev-20. In 1963, its closed status was lifted, town status was granted, and the name was changed to Aktau. This Ukrainian name for the city may have been granted due to the large number of Ukrainian workers who settled in the city. Their descendants are often easily identifiable to this day with many having surnames ending in '-enko'. After the dissolution of the Soviet Union and Kazakhstan gaining independence, the name Aktau was restored in 1991, but the city's airport still retains SCO as its IATA code.

The Mosque of Chahbagota's most surprising is that Islam has prohibited the depiction of humans or portions of their bodies but the portrayal of man's palm is represented at the walls of this mosque with lotus flowers.

Nuclear power plant
Aktau was once the site of a nuclear power station. The BN-350 FBR went online in 1973, and was shut down in 1999. The long-term plans of the Government of Kazakhstan include the construction of a new nuclear power station to be built near the site. In addition to producing plutonium, BN-350 was used to provide power and for desalination to supply fresh water to the city. The current station is not considered powerful enough to supply the fresh water and energy needed at this time, and blackouts are a common occurrence.

Transportation
Aktau has an international airport that was built in 1996. Aktau also has a developed seaport.

Kazakhstan has been increasing the importance of Aktau's port with its changes in international export policy. It has been attempting to halt the transit of grain through the Black Sea and instead use routes over the Caspian or via Turkmenistan. Aktau's port has been expanded (completion achieved summer 2015) to accommodate ever larger quantities and more diverse types of cargo. The intent is for cargo to transit by ship over the Caspian Sea and then by rail through Azerbaijan and Georgia for delivery in Turkey and beyond. This new route was made possible by the opening of a railway connecting Georgia and Turkey in 2014.

There is also a railway station Mangystau, about 12 km away from Aktau's city center. Trip from Aktau to Astana will take around 2 days, to Almaty around 3 days.

Buses and taxis are the principal means of public transport within the city.

Climate and leisure
It is notable that most of the city of Aktau lies below sea level in the Caspian Depression and is proximate to the lowest point in Kazakhstan and the former Soviet Union at Karagiye.

Aktau has both rocky hills and sandy beaches along the seashore. There are several modern resorts on the coast to the south of the city. The beaches of the Caspian shore are popular in the summer, due to the hot climate of the season. Tourists come mainly from other parts of Kazakhstan. The city has a variety of local hotels and western chains of Renaissance and Holiday Inn. 

In 2021, it was announced that three rare species of palms with resistance to freezing are being grown as part of an experiment in the Aktau region. The experiment is being performed by the Mangyshlak Experimental Botanical Garden in Aktau city.

Sights

The main attraction in the city remains the Caspian Sea with its long side walks and beaches. Other sights include:
World War II Eternal Flame Memorial in a shape reminiscent of a traditional yurt
MiG Monument at the Victory Mall
Regional Studies and History Museum
The Drama Theatre
Yntymak Square
Monuments of Famous people of the past: Kashagan, Zhalau Mynbayev and Taras Shevchenko

Sports
Aktau is the home of football club FC Caspiy. The club's home ground is Zhastar Stadium which has a capacity of 5,000. In 2019, they finished 2nd place in the Kazakhstan First Division and gained outright promotion to the Kazakhstan Premier League, the top division of football in Kazakhstan.

Time capsule
In 1967 the people of Aktau erected a time capsule to send a message to future generations of the Mangyshlak Peninsula, including names of people who helped to build the town in the desert. The letter was put in a metallic cylinder in a triangular marble urn. It was opened in November 2017. The capsule is located in District 2, opposite the 'Kazakhstan Trade Center.'

A ceremony to open the capsule was arranged and people traveled from far and wide to attend. This was subsequently postponed and then cancelled when it became known that capsule was, in fact, missing. Previously the capsule had been buried in another part of the town but building works in that location caused it to be relocated to the District 2 location. The capsule did not make the move. An official from the time of the creation of the capsule who had been involved in the drafting of a message to be included within the capsule was able to remember word for word the message that was written which by all accounts contained a theme of hope for the future.

Industry
Major industry of the city remains hydrocarbon production as one of the biggest producing regions of the country. 
In addition to its strategic location as the main seaport, Aktau attracted the biggest players of the oil service industry:
Schlumberger Caspian geomarket main base and pumps manufacturing
Baker Hughes Caspian geomarket main base
Halliburton Kazakhstan main base
Weatherford International Kazakhstan main base
Cameron International Kazakhstan main base
Tenaris premium pipes threading facility 
Arcelor Mittal pipelines manufacturing

Aktau city project

On September 11, 2007, President Nursultan Nazarbayev started the Aktau city project in order to develop tourism and attract investment. A totally new city was to have been built to the north-west of the current city with 4 million square meters of new residential and business buildings. The architecture style would have been derived from UAE's construction experience under the patronage of Sheikh Abdullah ibn Zaid Al Nahayan. In August 2013, the project was called off.

Twin towns and sister cities

Aktau is twinned with:
 Sumqayit, Azerbaijan
 Bandar-e Anzali, Iran
 Karamay, China 
 Changwon, South Korea
 Samsun, Turkey
 Makhachkala, Russia

References
Citations

Sources
Е. М. Поспелов (Ye. M. Pospelov). "Имена городов: вчера и сегодня (1917–1992). Топонимический словарь." (City Names: Yesterday and Today (1917–1992). Toponymic Dictionary." Москва, "Русские словари", 1993.

External links

Official website of Aktau 

 
Cities and towns in Kazakhstan
Cities and towns built in the Soviet Union
Port cities in Asia
Taras Shevchenko
Populated places on the Caspian Sea
Port cities and towns of the Caspian Sea
Populated places established in 1958
1958 establishments in the Kazakh Soviet Socialist Republic